The Railroad Museum of New England is a railroad museum based in Thomaston, Connecticut. Through its operating subsidiary known as the Naugatuck Railroad, the museum operates excursion and freight trains on the Torrington Secondary between Waterville and Torrington. The Railroad Museum of New England name and trademark was adopted in 1987, as a result of reassessing the Connecticut Valley Railroad Museum's goals and visions (CVRM had been founded in the mid-1960s). Home to one of the largest collections of preserved historic railroad equipment in New England, RMNE and its predecessor organizations have been active since the 1960s.

History

Origins
The CVRM (and predecessor organization - the Connecticut Valley Railroad Association [CVRA]) was responsible for organizing steam train excursions within Connecticut during the late 1960s and was instrumental in opening the Valley Railroad in Essex, Connecticut in 1971. The volunteers of the non-profit CVRA established a relationship with the for-profit Valley Railroad allowing for a permanent home for the organization's growing collection. In exchange, volunteers contributed to the upkeep and operation of the Valley Railroad's trains.

Through the 1980s, more pieces were added to the collection, restored, and occasionally operated on the Valley Railroad. By the end of the decade, it was clear CVRA would need to find its own home if they were to continue their mission of preservation and grow their collection.

Search for a permanent home (1993-1996)
The volunteers wanted to remain in Connecticut if possible, as it provided a central location for most of the active members. Once Conrail sold off its local freight operations to the Housatonic Railroad in 1993, they abandoned the former New Haven freight yard in Danbury, Connecticut. The complex included a turntable and former roundhouse site, active rail connections, and frequent passenger service provided by Metro-North Railroad's Danbury Branch. The site was turned down as there was no guarantee the museum would be able to operate regular excursions, which they saw as critical to their survival. Instead, the Danbury Railway Museum was established there in 1994.

Another location considered was the site of the former New Haven Columbia Junction roundhouse and freight yard in Willimantic, Connecticut. While the site offered plenty of room, almost nothing of the original facility remained other than a few derelict foundations. The active rail of the New England Central Railroad ran along the site, but there was no way the museum would be able to secure permission to operate excursions. Instead, the Connecticut Eastern Railroad Museum was established there in 1995.

The Naugatuck Railroad reborn (1996-present)

In early 1995, the RMNE was offered the opportunity to develop the ex-New Haven line from Waterbury to Torrington line, owned by Connecticut Department of Transportation (CDOT). RMNE chartered a "new" Naugatuck Railroad Company in June 1995 (150 years to the month after the original Naugatuck Railroad charter in 1845) and worked with CDOT Rail Operations to get the new railroad into operation during the 1996 season.

The railroad is headquartered at Thomaston station, built in 1881 and last used by passengers in 1958. Disused for many years, it was set on fire by vandals in 1993. Ownership was transferred to RMNE in 1996. With a grant from a local bank, the roof was replaced in 1997. Volunteers have been steadily repairing and restoring the building to its mid-century appearance.

Tourist excursions are run several days a week between May and December from the historic Thomaston Station. The 75-minute trip runs between Thomaston Dam and Waterville, covering about  total. Occasional passenger shuttles operate from East Litchfield and Torrington.

Special event trains are run during fall and winter months. 

RMNE has an extensive collection of locomotives and rolling stock of New England heritage, with over 60 pieces of full-sized railroad equipment. The New Haven, Boston & Maine, Maine Central, Rutland, and Bangor & Aroostook railroads are represented. Numerous smaller items, from signals to railroad corporate records, are also part of RMNE's artifact holdings.

Volunteers operate the trains and maintain the locomotives and other rolling stock.

Equipment

The following is a partial roster of historic locomotives preserved by RMNE and Naugatuck Railroad.

 New Haven Alco RS-3 No. 529
 
 New Haven EMD FL9 No. 2049 (restored as CDOT NH 2019)
 New Haven EMD FL9 No. 2059
 New Haven Alco FA No. 0401
 New Haven GE U25B No. 2525
 Naugatuck Railroad GE U23B No. 2203 (former Conrail 2798, Providence & Worcester 2203)
 Boston & Maine Railroad EMD SW-1 No. 1109
 Boston & Maine Alco RS3 No. 1508
 Boston & Maine EMD GP9 No. 1732
 Maine Central Railroad Alco RS-3 No. 557
 Pennsylvania Railroad Alco RS-3 No. 8912
 RMNE GE 25-ton No. 25
 Canadian Pacific Railway 4-6-2 No. 1246
 Sumter & Choctaw 2-6-2 No. 103
 Naugatuck Railroad EMD GP9 686 (Norfolk & Western 686, Hampton & Branchville 686)
 Naugatuck Railroad EMD GP9 859 (Norfolk & Western 859, Hampton & Branchville 859)

References

External links 

 Museum website 	

Thomaston, Connecticut
Railroad museums in Connecticut
Heritage railroads in Connecticut
Transportation in Litchfield County, Connecticut
Museums in Litchfield County, Connecticut